Ace Books is a publisher of science fiction (SF) and fantasy books founded in New York City in 1952 by Aaron A. Wyn. It began as a genre publisher of mysteries and westerns, and soon branched out into other genres, publishing its first science fiction title in 1953. This was successful, and science fiction titles outnumbered both mysteries and westerns within a few years. Other genres also made an appearance, including nonfiction, gothic novels, media tie-in novelizations, and romances.  Ace became known for the tête-bêche binding format used for many of its early books, although it did not originate the format. Most of the early titles were published in this "Ace Double" format, and Ace continued to issue books in varied genres, bound tête-bêche, until 1973.

Ace, along with Ballantine Books, was one of the leading science fiction publishers for its first ten years of operation. The death of owner A. A. Wyn in 1967 set the stage for a later decline in the publisher's fortunes. That was delayed several years by the Ace Science Fiction Specials series, prominent in science fiction awards and nominations for novels published from 1968 to 1970. Two leading editors, Donald A. Wollheim and Terry Carr, left in 1971, and in 1972 Ace was sold to Grosset & Dunlap. Despite financial troubles, there were further successes, particularly with the third Ace Science Fiction Specials series, for which Carr came back as editor. Further mergers and acquisitions resulted in the company becoming absorbed by Berkley Books. Ace later became an imprint of Penguin Group (USA).

History

1952: Ace Doubles concept

Editor Donald A. Wollheim was working at Avon Books in 1952, but disliked his job. While looking for other work, he tried to persuade A. A. Wyn to begin a new paperback publishing company. Wyn was already a well-established publisher of books and pulp magazines under the name A. A. Wyn's Magazine Publishers. His magazines included Ace Mystery and Ace Sports, and it is perhaps from these titles that Ace Books got its name. Wyn liked Wollheim's idea but delayed for several months; meanwhile, Wollheim was applying for other jobs, including assistant editor at Pyramid Books. Pyramid mistakenly called Wyn's wife Rose for a reference, thinking Wollheim had worked for her. When Rose told her husband that Wollheim was applying for another job, Wyn made up his mind: he hired Wollheim immediately as an editor.

The first book published by Ace was a pair of mysteries bound tête-bêche: Keith Vining's Too Hot for Hell, backed with Samuel W. Taylor's The Grinning Gismo, priced at 35 cents, with serial number D-01. A tête-bêche book has the two titles bound upside-down with respect to each other, so that there are two front covers and the two texts meet in the middle (sometimes with advertising pages in between). This format is generally regarded as an innovation of Ace's; it was not, but Ace published hundreds of titles bound this way over the next twenty-one years. Books by established authors were often bound with those by lesser-known writers, on the premise that this would help new writers gain readers. The main drawback of the "Ace Double" format was that the two books had to fit a fixed page length (usually totalling between 256 and 320 low-height pages); thus one or both novels might be cut or revised to fit. Despite the tag "Complete and Unabridged" on the cover, books so labeled were sometimes still abridged.

Some important titles in the early D-series novels are D-15, which features William S. Burroughs's first novel, Junkie (written under the pseudonym "William Lee"), and many novels by Philip K. Dick, Robert Bloch, Harlan Ellison, Harry Whittington, and Louis L'Amour, including those written under his pseudonym "Jim Mayo".

The last Ace Double in the first series was John T. Phillifent's Life with Lancelot, backed with William Barton's Hunting on Kunderer, issued August 1973 (serial #48245). Although Ace resumed using the "Ace Double" name in 1974, the books were arranged conventionally rather than tête-bêche.

1953–1963: Genre specialization
Ace's second title was a western (also tête-bêche): William Colt MacDonald's Bad Man's Return, bound with J. Edward Leithead's Bloody Hoofs. Mysteries and westerns alternated regularly for the first thirty titles, with a few books not in either genre, such as P. G. Wodehouse's Quick Service, bound with his The Code of the Woosters. In 1953, A.E. van Vogt's The World of Null-A, bound with his The Universe Maker, appeared; this was Ace's first foray into science fiction. (Earlier in 1953, Ace had released Theodore S. Drachman's Cry Plague!, with a plot that could be regarded as science fiction, but the book it was bound with—Leslie Edgley's The Judas Goat—is a mystery.) Another science fiction double followed later in 1953, and science fiction rapidly established itself, alongside westerns and mysteries, as an important part of Ace's business. By 1955, the company released more science fiction titles each year than in either of the other two genres, and from 1961 onward, science fiction titles outnumbered mysteries and westerns combined. Ace also published a number of lurid juvenile delinquent novels in the 1950s that are now very collectible, such as D-343, The Young Wolves by Edward De Roo and D-378, Out for Kicks by Wilene Shaw.

By the late 1950s, Ace's output was approaching one hundred titles a year, still heavily dominated by the primary genres. Almost all the books were 35 cents, though some slim single volumes were 25 cents, and a handful were half a dollar. In the early '60s, rising costs finally forced an increase in the price of the books, and more books appeared at 40 cents, 45 cents and higher. A few thick volumes, such as the 1967 paperback of Frank Herbert's Dune, were priced at 95 cents. With Ballantine Books, Ace was the dominant American science fiction paperback publisher in the 1950s and 1960s. Other publishers followed their lead, catering to the increasing audience for science fiction, but none matched the influence of either company.

Market dominance was not only reflected in numbers of books published—Ace published, during this period, the first novels of authors such as Philip K. Dick (Solar Lottery, 1955, D-103, bound with Leigh Brackett's The Big Jump); Gordon R. Dickson (Alien from Arcturus, 1956, D-139, bound with Nick Boddie Williams' The Atom Curtain), Samuel R. Delany (The Jewels of Aptor, 1962, F-173, bound with James White's Second Ending), Ursula K. Le Guin (Rocannon's World, 1966, G-574, bound with Avram Davidson's The Kar-Chee Reign), Roger Zelazny (This Immortal, 1966, F-393),
and R. A. Lafferty's Past Master (1968, H-54).

1964–1970: Financial struggles

In 1964, science fiction author Terry Carr joined the company, and in 1967, he initiated the Ace Science Fiction Specials line, publishing critically acclaimed original novels by such authors as R. A. Lafferty, Joanna Russ and Ursula K. Le Guin. Carr and Wollheim also co-edited an annual Year's Best Science Fiction anthology series; and Carr also edited Universe, a well-received original anthology series. Universe was initially published by Ace, although when Carr left in 1971 the series moved elsewhere.

In 1965, Wollheim argued that there was a copyright loophole in the American edition of The Lord of the Rings by J. R. R. Tolkien. The Houghton Mifflin edition had been bound using pages printed in the United Kingdom for the George Allen & Unwin edition, and as a result, U.S. copyright law might not protect the text. Based on this view, Ace Books published the first-ever paperback edition of Tolkien's work, featuring cover art and hand-drawn title pages by Jack Gaughan. After considerable controversy and the release of a competitive authorized (and revised) edition by Ballantine Books (the back covers of which included a message from Tolkien urging consumers to buy the Ballantine edition and boycott any "unauthorized" versions – implying the Ace editions), Ace agreed to pay royalties to Tolkien and let its still-popular edition go out of print.

Wyn died in 1967, and the company grew financially overextended, failing to pay its authors reliably. Without money to pay the signing bonus, Wollheim was unwilling to send signed contracts to authors. On at least one occasion, a book without a valid contract went to the printer, and Wollheim later found out that the author, who was owed $3,000 by Ace, was reduced to picking fruit for a living.

1971–2015: Ace becomes a subsidiary

Both Wollheim and Carr left Ace in 1971. Wollheim had made plans to launch a separate paperback house, and in cooperation with New American Library, he proceeded to set up DAW Books. Carr became a freelance editor; both Carr and Wollheim went on to edit competing Year's Best Science Fiction anthology series.

By the early 1970s, Ace Books became a major division of the old publisher, Charter Communications, which was based out of the Hippodrome Building, 1120 Avenue of the Americas, in New York City. In 1972, Ace was acquired by Grosset & Dunlap, and in 1982, Grosset & Dunlap was in turn acquired by G.P. Putnam's Sons. Ace was reputedly the only profitable element of the Grosset & Dunlap empire by this time. Ace soon became the science fiction imprint of its parent company.

Carr returned to Ace Books in 1984 as a freelance editor, launching a new series of Ace Specials devoted entirely to first novels. This series was even more successful than the first: it included, in 1984 alone, William Gibson's Neuromancer, Kim Stanley Robinson's The Wild Shore, Lucius Shepard's Green Eyes, and Michael Swanwick's In the Drift. All were first novels by authors now regarded as major figures in the genre. Other prominent science fiction publishing figures who have worked at Ace include Tom Doherty, who left to start Tor Books, and Jim Baen, who left to work at Tor and who eventually founded Baen Books. Writers who have worked at Ace include Frederik Pohl and Ellen Kushner.

In 1996, Penguin Group (USA) acquired the Putnam Berkley Group, and has retained Ace as its science fiction imprint.  As of December 2012, recently published authors included Joe Haldeman, Charles Stross, Laurell K. Hamilton, Alastair Reynolds, and Jack McDevitt. Penguin merged with Random House in 2013 to form Penguin Random House, which continues to own Berkley. Ace's editorial team is also responsible for the Roc Books imprint, although the two imprints maintain a separate identity.

People
The following people have worked at Ace Books in various editorial roles. The list is sorted in order of the date they started working at Ace, where known. It includes editors who are notable for some reason, as well as the most recent editors at the imprint.
 A. A. Wyn, owner (1952–1967)
 Donald A. Wollheim, editor (1952–1971)
 Terry Carr, editor (1964–1971); freelance editor (1983–1987)
 Pat LoBrutto, mail room (1969–1972); science fiction editor (1974–1977)
 Frederik Pohl, executive editor (December 1971 – July 1972)
 Tom Doherty, publisher (1975–1980)
 Jim Baen, complaints department (c. 1973–1974); gothics editor (c. 1974); science fiction editor (c. 1977–1980)
 Ellen Kushner
 Terri Windling, editor (1979–1987)
 Harriet McDougal, editorial director
 Susan Allison, editor (1980–1982); editor-in-chief (1982–2006); vice president (1985 – July 2015)
 Beth Meacham, editorial assistant (1981–1982); editor (1982–1983)
 Ginjer Buchanan, editor (1984–1987); senior editor (1987–1994); executive editor, science fiction and fantasy (1994 – January 1996); senior executive editor and marketing director (January 1996 – 2006); editor-in-chief (2006–2014).
 Peter Heck (c. 1991–1992)
 Laura Anne Gilman (c. 1991)
 Lou Stathis, editor (? – c. 1994)
 Anne Sowards, editorial assistant/associate editor (1996–2003); editor (2003 – February 2007), senior editor (from February 2007), executive editor (by September 2010)

Ace nomenclature
Until the late 1980s, Ace titles had two main types of serial numbers: letter series, such as "D-31" and "H-77", and numeric, such as "10293" and "15697". The letters were used to indicate a price. The following is a list of letter series with their date ranges and prices.
 D-series: 35¢, 1952 to 1962.
 S-series: 25¢, 1952 to 1956.
 T-series: 40¢. This series is listed in Tuck's Encyclopedia, but he gives no examples in his index and there are none cited in other bibliographic sources. This series may, therefore, not exist.
 F-series: 40¢, 1961 to 1967.
 M-series: 45¢, 1964 to 1967.
 G-series: 50¢, 1958 to 1960 (D/S/G series); 1964 to 1968 (later series).
 K-series: various prices, 1959 to 1966.
 H-series: 60¢, 1966 to 1968.
 A-series: 75¢, 1963 to 1968.
 N-series: 95¢, 1968.

The first series of Ace books began in 1952 with D-01, a western in tête-bêche format: Keith Vining's Too Hot for Hell backed with Samuel W. Taylor's The Grinning Gismo. That series continued until D-599, Patricia Libby's Winged Victory for Nurse Kerry, but the series also included several G and S serial numbers, depending on the price. The D and S did not indicate "Double" (i.e., tête-bêche) or "Single"; there are D-series titles that are not tête-bêche, although none of the tête-bêche titles have an S serial number.  Towards the end of this initial series, the F series began (at a new price), and thereafter there were always several different letter series in publication simultaneously. The D and S prefixes did not appear again after the first series, but the G prefix acquired its own series starting with G-501. Hence the eight earlier G-series titles can be considered part of a different series to the G-series proper. All later series after the first kept independent numbering systems, starting at 1 or 101.  The tête-bêche format proved attractive to book collectors, and some rare titles in mint condition command prices over $1,000.

See also 
 Category:Lists of Ace Books books

References

Further reading

 Corrick, James A. Double Your Pleasure: The Ace SF Double, Gryphon Books, 1989. . A historical article, followed by a checklist of the SF Doubles, giving prior publication history for the contents of each one.
 Thiessen, J. Grant Science Fiction Collector #1, Pandora's Books, 1976. Includes checklist of all Ace singles and doubles in the science fiction, fantasy, and horror fields.
 Thiessen, J. Grant Science Fiction Collector #2, Pandora's Books, date unknown. Includes errata for checklist in #1.
 Tuck, Donald H. The Encyclopedia of Science Fiction and Fantasy: Volume 3, Advent: Publishers, Inc., 1982. . Lists all Ace SF titles, single and double, published through 1968.
 Jaffery, Sheldon Double Trouble: A Bibliographic Chronicle of Ace Mystery Doubles, Starmont Popular Culture Series #11, Borgo Press, 1987. .
 Jaffery, Sheldon Double Futures: An Annotated Bibliography of the Ace Science Fiction Doubles, Borgo Press, 1999. .
 Peters, Harold R. Science Fiction, Fantasy & Horror in the Ace Letter-Series Editions: A Collector's Notebook, Silver Sun Press, 1996.

External links

 Ace Image Library. Contains images of most covers for the doubles in all genres, as well as many of the single titles.
 History on the Penguin Group website

 
1952 establishments in the United States
American speculative fiction publishers
Book publishing companies based in New York (state)
Fantasy book publishers
Pearson plc
Publishing companies established in 1952
Science fiction publishers